Reid Kempe (born 22 October 1950) is a Bermudian sailor. He competed in the Tornado event at the 1992 Summer Olympics.

References

External links
 

1950 births
Living people
Bermudian male sailors (sport)
Olympic sailors of Bermuda
Sailors at the 1992 Summer Olympics – Tornado
Place of birth missing (living people)